Grangeville may refer to:
 Grangeville, California
 Grangeville, Idaho